Amir Renatovich Batyrev (born 11 March 2002) is a Russian-Canadian football player who plays for PFC Sochi.

Club career
On 10 July 2022, Batyrev signed with Russian Premier League club PFC Sochi. He made his debut in the Russian Premier League for Sochi on 7 August 2022 in a game against FC Pari Nizhny Novgorod. He scored his first goal for Sochi on 14 September 2022 in a Russian Cup game against FC Torpedo Moscow.

International career
In 2015, Batyrev was called up to a Canadian U-15 national team identification camp under head coach Ante Jazić.

Personal life
Batyrev was born in Toronto, Ontario, Canada and holds Canadian citizenship. His parents immigrated to Canada from Kalmykia in the 1990s.

References

Career statistics

External links
 
 
 
 

2002 births
Soccer players from Toronto
Canadian people of Russian descent
Living people
Russian footballers
Canadian soccer players
Association football midfielders
PFC Sochi players
Russian Second League players
Russian Premier League players